Alida Indra Jasmin Morberg (born 30 January 1985) is a Swedish actress.

Personal life 
Alida Morberg is the daughter of actor Per Morberg and she grew up in Lilla Edet. She is in a relationship with actor Bill Skarsgård, with whom she has one child.

Filmography 
 Gangster (2007)
 Insane (2010)
 Maria Wern – Stum sitter guden (2010)
 Medan du blundar (2011)
 Elsas värld (2011), Marilyn
 Rosor, kyssar och döden (2013)
 Stockholm Stories (2014)
 Beck – Rum 302 (2015)
 Black Lake (2018) – TV series
 Clark (2022) – TV series

References

External links 
 

1985 births
Living people
Swedish actresses